Island Savings, a division of First West Credit Union, is based in British Columbia, Canada. Since 1951, Island Savings has served communities on Vancouver Island and Gulf Islands.

In 2013, Island Savings entered into discussions with B.C.-based First West Credit Union. In November 2014, members Island Savings voted in favour of the merger proposal, and on Jan. 1, 2015, Island Savings joined First West's network. The First West brand network also includes Envision Financial, Valley First and Enderby & District Financial.

First West Credit Union has $14 billion in total assets and assets under management, approximately 1,250 employees and more than 250,000 members. The credit union is the third largest in B.C. and the fifth largest in Canada. Its divisions—Envision Financial, Valley First, Island Savings and Enderby & District Financial—operate under their existing brand names in their respective markets.

About Island Savings
Island Savings has 13 branches in Duncan, Chemainus, Brentwood, Lake Cowichan, Mill Bay, Nanaimo, Pender Island, Saltspring Island, and Victoria. Its administration centre is located in Duncan.

Community investment
Island Savings is dedicated to making a difference in the lives of local families. The Growing Island Families Together (GIFT) program provides leadership, sponsorship, financial, and in-kind support to community groups. Each Island Savings branch accepts GIFT applications  from local groups and organizations with initiatives that help to improve families’ quality of life and build strong communities.

In 2014, Island Savings established a $2 million Island Savings community endowment through the First West Foundation.

Island Savings has partnered with such organizations as the BC Cancer Foundation's Inspire the World Campaign, Big Brothers Big Sisters of Greater Victoria, Pacific Institute for Sport Excellence, Success by Six, and the Victoria Foundation.

Membership
Island Savings is a division of First West Credit Union which is a member of Central 1 Credit Union and is registered with the Credit Union Deposit Insurance Corporation of BC.

External links
Island Savings official site

References

First West Credit Union
Banks established in 1951
Duncan, British Columbia
1951 establishments in British Columbia